Tagish was a language spoken by the Tagish or Carcross-Tagish, a First Nations people that historically lived in the Northwest Territories and Yukon in Canada. The name Tagish derives from /ta:gizi dene/, or "Tagish people", which is how they refer to themselves, where /ta:gizi/ is a place name meaning "it (spring ice) is breaking up.

The language is a Northern Athabaskan language, closely related to Tahltan and Kaska. The three languages are often grouped together as Tahltan-Kaska-Tagish; the three languages are considered dialects of the same language by some. As of 2004, there was only 1 native fluent speaker of Tagish documented: Lucy Wren (Agaymā/Ghùch Tlâ). She died in 2008.

Classification 
Tagish is among many other languages within the large language family of Na-Dene languages, which includes another group of indigenous North American languages called the Athabaskan languages. The Northern Athabaskan languages are often considered to be part of a complex of languages entitled Tagish-Tahltan-Kaska. The languages in this complex have an extremely similar lexicon and grammar but differ in systems of obstruents. Known alternatively as Dene K'e, Tagish is also closely related to the neighboring languages Tahltan, Kaska, and Southern Tutchone.

History 
The culture of the Tagish people has its roots in both the coastal Indian cultures and those from the interior (Tlingit and Athabaskan languages, Athapaskan respectively). Trade and travel across the Chilkoot pass contributed to the mixing of these cultures. In the 19th and early 20th centuries, Tlingit-speaking peoples began to move in from the coast and intermarry with the native Tagish-speaking population. By the time outsiders first made contact in the 1880s, the majority of the people were bilingual, and the Tlingit language had replaced Tagish as the language of the majority.

Tagish became less common partially because native traditions were domesticated and suppressed in writing by the colonial administration. The most significant impact on the decline of nearly every native language in Canada came when aboriginal children were forced to attend residential schools where they were forbidden to speak their own languages.

After the Yukon Gold Rush in 1898, English became the majority language of the area. As the majority of children attended the English-only Chooutla Anglican school nearby, fluency in the native languages began to be lost. Language courses began to be reintroduced in the 1970s, but the programs had little funding and were not comparable to the French or English programs present. More recently, political awareness has led to movements to gain constitutional provisions for the language, as well as a greater focus on in-school programs, language conferences, and public awareness. For example, beginning in 2004, Southern Tutchone and Tagish languages were being revitalized and protected through an on-line approach called FirstVoices.

The federal government signed an agreement giving the territory $4.25 million over five years to "preserve, develop and enhance aboriginal languages", however Tagish was not one of the offered native language programs. Ken McQueen  stated that despite efforts, the language will likely become extinct after the last fluent Tagish speaker dies.

Tagish on First Voices 
FirstVoices is an indigenous language computer database and web-based teaching and development tool. Tagish was one of the first to be added to the FirstVoices digital multimedia archive of endangered indigenous languages. Resources on the site include sound files of name pronunciation, word lists, and some children's books written in the language. This language documentation is intended to create a holistic platform where identity, oral tradition, elders' knowledge and the centrality of the land can all be intertwined.  On the Tagish FirstVoices page, there are a total of 36 words and 442 phrases archived and sound recordings of the alphabet.  To provide a cultural context, there are also a community slide show and art gallery section. This website includes greetings  from a multitude of elders complete with contact information about the website's contributors.

Notable people 
Angela Sidney was a prominent activist for the use and reclamation of her Tagish language and heritage in the southern Yukon Territory. Born in 1902, her heritage was Tagish on her father's side and Tlingit on her mother's side. Sidney's accomplishments include working with Julie Cruikshank, documenting and authoring traditional stories as well as becoming a member of the Order of Canada in 1986. Sidney died in 1991.

Lucy Wren was the last known fluent speaker. She was actively involved in the recordings and stories used on the First Voices website including the "Our Elders Statement" before passing in 2008. This work by Lucy Wren has been continued by her son Norman James as he works to record more language and culture of the Tagish and Tlingit people for the Yukon Native Language Centre and the First Voices website.

Geographic Distribution 
The Tagish people make their territory in southern Yukon Territory and northern British Columbia in Canada, most specifically at Tagish, which lies between Marsh Lake and Tagish Lake, and Carcross, located between Bennett and Nares Lake. The language was used most frequently in the Lewes and Teslin plateaus.

Phonology 
The Tagish language includes aspiration, glottalization, nasal sounds, resonance, and tones.

Tagish is characterized by the simplest stem-initial consonant system of the Northern Athabaskan languages,  has a conservative vowel system and conserves  stem-final consonants. Final glottalization is lost. Constricted vowels are pronounced with low tone.

The Tagish language includes nouns, verbs, and particles. Particles and nouns are single, sometimes compounded, morphemes, but the difference is that nouns can be inflected and particles cannot. Verbs are the most complex class in this language because their stemmed morphemes have many prefixes which indicate inflectional and derivational categories.

The total inventory of phonemes present in Tagish includes:

The language makes use of the Latin writing system.

Consonants

Vowels 
The short vowels /i, e, a, o, u/; as well as their long counterparts /iː, eː, aː, oː, uː/.

Long vowels are denoted with a macron as follows: . Nasal vowels are denoted by a hook as follows: .

Tone 
High tone is marked with (v́) on short vowels and (v́v) on long vowels while low tones remain unmarked

Vocabulary 
Some women's names contain the nasalized prefix Maa which translates directly to "mother of."

See also

 Tagish
 Tahltan

References

External links
Yukon Native Language Centre's introduction to the Tagish Language
Audio lessons. https://web.archive.org/web/20080110174009/http://www.ynlc.ca/materials/lessons/wrenl/index.html
 Audio storybooks. http://www.ynlc.ca/materials/stories/tg.html
OLAC resources in and about the Tagish language
The Tagish First Voices Project. http://www.firstvoices.com/en/Tagish/welcome
Word list. http://www.firstvoices.com/en/Tagish/words
Phrases. http://www.firstvoices.com/en/Tagish/phrase-books
Audio files of First Words. http://www.firstvoices.com/en/Tagish
Audio files, word lists, and other resources at Glottlog. http://glottolog.org/resource/languoid/id/tagi1240
List of English-Tagish word lists. Renato, F. B. (2014, March 21). Freelang Tagish-English dictionary. Retrieved from http://www.freelang.net/dictionary/tagish.php

The Endangered Languages Project. http://www.endangeredlanguages.com/lang/1448

Northern Athabaskan languages
Indigenous languages of the North American Subarctic
First Nations languages in Canada
First Nations in Yukon
Endangered Athabaskan languages
2008 disestablishments in Alaska
Extinct languages of North America
Languages extinct in the 2000s